This is a list of notable individuals born in Brazil of Lebanese ancestry or people of Lebanese and Brazilian dual nationality who live or lived in Brazil.

Arts
Antonio Abujamra - playwright and actor
Sergio Assad - artist
João Bosco - singer
Fagner - singer
Milton Hatoum - writer
Malu Mader - actress
Tito Madi - artist
Raduan Nassar - writer
Almir Sater - singer
Wanderlea - singer

Athletes
 Branco - football (soccer) player
 Nacif Elias - Lebanese olympian in judo
 Luís Fernandes - football (soccer) player
 Gilberto - football (soccer) player
 Tony Kanaan -  race car driver
 Allam Khodair -  race car driver
 Marcílio - football (soccer) player
 Thaísa Menezes - volleyball player
 Jadir Morgenstern - football (soccer) player
 Felipe Nasr -  race car driver
 Newton - football (soccer) player
 Emil Assad Rached - professional basketball player
 Salomão Salha - football (soccer) player
 Mario Zagallo - soccer player and coach

Business
 Alberto Dualib - businessman
 Carlos Ghosn -  businessman
 Edmond Safra - businessman
 Joseph Safra - businessman
 Roberto Dualibi - advertising executive
 Moise Safra - businessman

Entertainment
 Luciana Gimenez - television presenter
 Arnaldo Jabor -  film director, screenwriter and producer
 Sabrina Sato - comedian and television presenter
 Joãosinho Trinta - director of parades for Samba Schools in Rio de Janeiro Brazil during Carnival (carnavalesco)
 Julia Gama - Miss Brasil 2020, 1st Runner-Up at Miss Universe 2020

Politics
 Geraldo Alckmin - governor of São Paulo state
 José Maria Alkmin - vice-president of Brazil (1964-1967)
 Iolanda Fleming - politician, former governor of Acre
 Fernando Haddad - politician
 Tasso Jereissati - former governor of Ceará state
 Gilberto Kassab - former mayor of São Paulo
 Paulo Maluf -  former governor of São Paulo state
 Pedro Simon - former senator
 Simone Tebet - senator, presidential candidate
 Michel Temer - former president of Brazil

Medicine
 Roger Abdelmassih - former in vitro doctor accused of sexual assault against women
 Adib Jatene - heart surgeon

See also
Lebanese Brazilian
Arab Brazilian
List of Lebanese people
List of Lebanese people (Diaspora)

References

Brazil
Lebanese

Lebanese